Frederick Henry "Did" Vorrath (13 June 1908 – 2 July 1972) played 12 rugby union matches for the All Blacks in 1935 but no tests. He was born and died in Dunedin and was a builder by trade.

External links
 

1908 births
1972 deaths
New Zealand international rugby union players
New Zealand rugby union players
Otago rugby union players
Rugby union players from Dunedin
Rugby union forwards